Easy Does It may refer to:

Film
 Easy Does It (1949 film) or The Great Lover, a comedy directed by Alexander Hall
 Easy Does It (2019 film), a crime film featuring Bryan Batt

Music

Albums
 Easy Does It (Al Kooper album), 1970
 Easy Does It (Bobby Timmons album), 1961
 Easy Does It (Jake Owen album), 2009
 Easy Does It (Julie London album), 1968
 Easy Does It, by Charlie Palmieri, 1959
 Easy Does It, by Isabelle Antena, 2005

Songs
 "Easy Does It", composed by Sy Oliver and Trummy Young, 1939
 "Easy Does It", by Anne Murray from The Hottest Night of the Year, 1982
 "Easy Does It", by Bill Barron from The Next Plateau, 1989
 "Easy Does It", by David Coverdale and Jimmy Page from Coverdale–Page, 1993
 "Easy Does It", by Hot Apple Pie from Hot Apple Pie, 2006
 "Easy Does It", by Jaye P. Morgan, 1958
 "Easy Does It", by Oli Silk, 2006
 "Easy Does It", by Sandy Bull from Demolition Derby, 1972
 "Easy Does It", by Supertramp from Crisis? What Crisis?, 1985

See also
 Eazy-Duz-It, a 1988 album by Eazy-E
 "Eazy-Duz-It" (song), the title song
 Rosa 'Easy Does It', a rose cultivar